Richard Yates Stevens (born December 12, 1948) is a former Republican member of the North Carolina General Assembly. He represented the state's seventeenth Senate district, including constituents in Wake County, North Carolina. A management consultant and former county manager from Cary, North Carolina, Stevens was elected to five consecutive terms in the state Senate. He chose not to run for another term in 2012, and then resigned before the end of his term.

References

External links
Senator Richard Stevens — North Carolina General Assembly
Raleigh News & Observer profile
 Richard Stevens at Ballotpedia
Project Vote Smart – Richard Stevens (NC) profile
Our Campaigns – Richard Stevens (NC) profile

North Carolina state senators
Living people
21st-century American politicians
1948 births